Amada Elsa López Rodríguez (born 17 January 1943) is an Equatoguinean-Spanish writer specializing in poetry.

Biography
Elsa López was born and lived in Fernando Poo (now Bioko), Equatorial Guinea until 1947, the year she moved to the island of La Palma, Canary Islands. In 1955 she moved to Madrid where she began Baccalaureate studies.

In 1965 she obtained a licentiate in Philosophy from the Complutense University of Madrid and, after a year as a professor of Spanish Literature in Lausanne, Switzerland, in 1966 she became a professor at the liberal  in Madrid, successor to the Institución Libre de Enseñanza.

From 1987 to 1989 she chaired the Literature Section of the Ateneo de Madrid and directed the Siddharth Mehta publishing house, creating her own publishing house in 1989, Ediciones La Palma.

In 1993 López received the First José Pérez Vidal Research Prize and moved to the Canary Islands on a commission to direct and coordinate the government projects El Papel de Canarias (1993) and Memoria de las islas (1994–2000). That same year she founded the Casa de Jorós ethnographic museum and popular art center in Santa Cruz de La Palma.

From 2002 to 2006 she directed the Antonio Gala Foundation for Young Creators. She was dismissed because of disagreements with Antonio Gala, although the writer had previously announced that she wanted to leave the position.

She currently directs Ediciones La Palma and Promoción Cero.

Her work has been recognized with numerous awards, such as the City of Melilla International Poetry Award in 1987 and the First José Pérez Vidal Research Prize in 1993, and has been included in several anthologies and translated into different languages.

Awards
 City of Melilla International Poetry Award, 1987
 Rosa de Damasco International Poetry Award, 1989
 First José Pérez Vidal Research Prize, 1993
 12th , 2002
 13th Ricardo Molina City of Córdoba Poetry Award, 2005
 , 2016

Works

Poetry

References

External links
 

1943 births
20th-century Spanish women writers
21st-century Spanish women writers
Complutense University of Madrid alumni
Equatoguinean poets
Equatoguinean women writers
Equatoguinean women poets
Living people
People from Malabo
Spanish anthropologists
Spanish biographers
Spanish women poets
Spanish women anthropologists
Women biographers